Pia Fries (born 6 October 1955) is a Swiss painter.

Biography   
Fries was born in Beromünster, Switzerland and studied sculpture in Lucerne in 1980, and painting under Gerhard Richter at the Kunstakademie Düsseldorf in 1986. She lives and works in Düsseldorf and Munich.

Museum collections
 Aargauer Kunsthaus, Aarau, Switzerland.
 Binding Stiftung, Basel, Switzerland.
 Kunstmuseum Luzern, Switzerland.
 Kunstmuseum Winterthur, Switzerland.
 Neues Museum, Nuremberg, Germany.
 Niedersächsische Kulturstiftung, Hannover, Germany.
 Staatsgalerie Stuttgart, Germany.
Museum of Fine Arts, Houston (MFAH), Houston, Texas

Selected exhibitions
 1992 Pia Fries, Kunstmuseum Luzern, Luzern; Bonner Kunstverein, Bonn
 1997 Pia Fries, Kunstverein Freiburg i.Br.; Aargauer Kunsthaus, Aarau; Museum Kurhaus Kleve, Kleve
 1999 La Biennale di Venezia: 48. esposizione internazionale d’arte: dapertutto
 1999 Pia Fries: parsen und module, Kunstverein Göppingen, (Kat.)
 2000 Pia Fries: en détail & en gros, Overbeck-Gesellschaft, Lübeck
 2001 Beau Monde: Toward a Redeemed Cosmopolitanism, The Fourth International Biennial, SITE Santa Fe
 2005 Extreme Abstraction, Albright-Knox Art Gallery, Buffalo, NY 
 2007 Pia Fries: Malerei 1990-2007, Kunstmuseum Winterthur; Josef Albers Museum Quadrat, Bottrop
 2008 Pia Fries: la partie élévatrice, Galeria Filomena Soares, Lisbon
 2009 Pia Fries: merian’s surinam, Galerie Nelson-Freeman, Paris
 2010 Pia Fries: zirkumpolar,  Galería Distrito Cu4tro, Madrid 
 2010 Pia Fries, Kunstmuseum Bonn
 2010 Pia Fries: ambigu, Kunstmuseum St. Gallen
 2011 Pia Fries: krapprhizom luisenkupfer, Staatliche Kunsthalle Karlsruhe
 2011 Pia Fries: Ausstellung der Kunstpreisträgerin, Villa Wessel, Iserlohn
 2012 Pia Fries: randmeer, CRG Gallery, NY
 2013 Pia Fries: wetter fahnen fächer, Galerie Nelson-Freeman, Paris
 2014 Pia Fries, paysages maritimes, Christopher Grimes Gallery L.A.
 2015 Pia Fries: windhand laufbein,  Akku-Emmen, Emmenbrücke, Lucerne
 2015 Pia Fries: fernleib manual, MAI 36 Galerie, Zurich
 2015 Pia Fries: tabula coloribus, Kunstparterre, Munich
 2015 Pia Fries: volume & light
 2016 Ortswechsel, Werke aus dem Kunstmuseum Bonn, Schauwerk Sindelfingen
 2016 Pia Fries: oxyponto, Galerie Thomas, Munich
 2016 Drama Queens - Die inszenierte Ausstellung, Museum Morsbroich, Leverkusen
 2016 Tiefe nach Außen, Galerie der Künstler, Munich
 2016 Die Erfindung der Abstraktion, Akademie Galerie, Düsseldorf
 2016 Pia Fries: Weisswirt & Maserzug, Kopfermann-Fuhrmann-Stiftung, Düsseldorf, 
 2016 Pia Fries: seascapes, Christopher Grimes Gallery, Los Angeles
 2017 THINK-PAINT, Unix-Gallery, New York
 2017 Künstlerporträts Düsseldorf 1800 bis heute, Akademie Galerie, Düsseldorf
 2017 20. Kunstausstellung Trubschachen 2017, Trubschachen, Schweiz
 2017 Pia Fries: nasen und nauen, Galerie Ute Parduhn, Düsseldorf
 2017 Pia Fries, Moss Art Center, Virginia, U.S.A.
 2017 Hendrick Goltzius + Pia Fries: proteus und polymorphia, Museum Kurhaus Kleve
 2017 Pia Fries: Vier Winde, Gerhard-Altenbourg Preis, Lindenau-Museum Altenburg
 2018 Pia Fries: parsen und module, Musée d’art moderne de la Ville de Paris, 9.3.-20.5.2018

Resources

External links 
 

1955 births
Living people
20th-century Swiss painters
21st-century Swiss painters
20th-century Swiss women artists
21st-century Swiss women artists
Swiss women painters
Academic staff of Kunstakademie Düsseldorf
Swiss contemporary artists